1-Hydroxycarotenoid 3,4-desaturase (CrtD, hydroxyneurosporene desaturase, carotenoid 3,4-dehydrogenase, 1-hydroxy-carotenoid 3,4-dehydrogenase) is an enzyme with systematic name 1-hydroxy-1,2-dihydrolycopene:acceptor oxidoreductase. This enzyme catalyses the following chemical reaction

 1-hydroxy-1,2-dihydrolycopene + acceptor  1-hydroxy-3,4-didehydro-1,2-dihydrolycopene + reduced acceptor

The enzymes from Rubrivivax gelatinosus and Rhodobacter sphaeroides acts primarily on acyclic carotenoids.

References

External links 
 

EC 1.3.99